Piesocalus is a monotypic genus of Southeast Asian dwarf spiders containing the single species, Piesocalus javanus. It was first described by Eugène Louis Simon in 1894, and has only been found in Indonesia and on the Java.

See also
 List of Linyphiidae species (I–P)

References

Linyphiidae
Monotypic Araneomorphae genera
Spiders of Asia